Amelia Etlinger was an artist associated with the Fluxus movement, visual poetry and the Italian Poesie Vivisa community. She was born in New York City in 1933 and died in Clifton Park, NY in 1987. Her works can be found in the University of Buffalo Libraries, Jean Brown Collection at the Getty Museum, the archive of the Museo di Arte Moderna e Contemporanea di Trento e Rovereto, and the rare books of the New York Public Library.

External links 
 Amelia Etlinger - Un percorso attraverso le raccolte dell'Archivio del '900, MART Museum, Trento, Italy

References 

1933 births
1977 deaths
Artists from New York City
20th-century American women artists
Fluxus